The 1908 Philadelphia Athletics season involved the A's finishing sixth in the American League with a record of 68 wins and 85 losses.

Preseason

1908 Philadelphia City Series
The Athletics played four games against the Philadelphia Phillies for the local championship in the pre-season city series. The Athletics defeated the Phillies 3 games to 1.

The A's record against the Phillies was 21–20 all time after the 1908 series.

Regular season

Season standings

Record vs. opponents

Roster

Player stats

Batting

Starters by position 
Note: Pos = Position; G = Games played; AB = At bats; H = Hits; Avg. = Batting average; HR = Home runs; RBI = Runs batted in

Other batters 
Note: G = Games played; AB = At bats; H = Hits; Avg. = Batting average; HR = Home runs; RBI = Runs batted in

Pitching

Starting pitchers 
Note: G = Games pitched; IP = Innings pitched; W = Wins; L = Losses; ERA = Earned run average; SO = Strikeouts

Other pitchers 
Note: G = Games pitched; IP = Innings pitched; W = Wins; L = Losses; ERA = Earned run average; SO = Strikeouts

Relief pitchers 
Note: G = Games pitched; W = Wins; L = Losses; SV = Saves; ERA = Earned run average; SO = Strikeouts

Notes

References 
1908 Philadelphia Athletics team page at Baseball Reference
1908 Philadelphia Athletics team page at www.baseball-almanac.com

Oakland Athletics seasons
Philadelphia Athletics season
Philadelphia Athletics